UGR may refer to:

 University of Granada
 Unified Glare Rating
 Unitized Group Ration